Tundradalskyrkja is a mountain on the border of Skjåk Municipality in Innlandet county and Luster Municipality in Vestland county, Norway. The mountain is surrounded by several other notable mountains including Gjelhøi to the east, Holåtindan to the southeast, Tverrådalskyrkja to the west, and Syrtbyttnosi to the northwest.

See also
List of mountains of Norway

References

Luster, Norway
Skjåk
Mountains of Innlandet
Mountains of Vestland